Films made in the 1990s featuring the character of James Bond are GoldenEye, Tomorrow Never Dies, and The World Is Not Enough. The films are notable for several "firsts": The first Bond film starring Pierce Brosnan as James Bond (GoldenEye); the first appearance of the Walther P99 as Bond's pistol (Tomorrow Never Dies); and the first (and last) Bond film in which the titular spy drives a BMW, all as part of a three-film product placement deal with the manufacturer.

GoldenEye (1995)
Principal photography for the film GoldenEye began on 16 January 1995 and continued until 6 June. The producers were unable to film at Pinewood Studios, the usual location for Bond films, because it had been reserved for First Knight. Instead, an old Rolls-Royce factory at the Leavesden Aerodrome in Hertfordshire was converted into a new studio. The producers later said Pinewood would have been too small.

The bungee jump was filmed at the Contra Dam (also known as the Verzasca or Locarno Dam) in Ticino, Switzerland. The film's casino scenes and the Tiger helicopter's demonstration were shot in Monte Carlo. Reference footage for the tank chase was shot on location in St. Petersburg and matched to the studio at Leavesden. The climactic scenes on the satellite dish were shot at Arecibo Observatory in Puerto Rico. The actual MI6 headquarters were used for external views of M's office. Some of the scenes in St. Petersburg were actually shot in London – the Epsom Downs Racecourse doubled the airport – to reduce expenses and security concerns, as the second unit sent to Russia required bodyguards.

The French Navy provided full use of the frigate FS La Fayette and their newest helicopter, the Eurocopter Tiger to the film's production team. The French government also allowed the use of Navy logos as part of the promotional campaign for the film. However, the producers had a dispute with the French Ministry of Defence over Brosnan's opposition to French nuclear weapons testing and his involvement with Greenpeace; as a result, the French premiere of the film was cancelled.

The sequences involving the armoured train were filmed on the Nene Valley Railway, near Peterborough in the UK. The train was composed of a British Rail Class 20 diesel-electric locomotive and a pair of BR Mk 2 coaches, all three heavily disguised to resemble a Soviet armoured train.

Tomorrow Never Dies (1997)

For the film Tomorrow Never Dies, the second unit filming began on 18 January 1997 with Vic Armstrong directing; they filmed the pre-credits sequence at the Peyresourde Airport in the French Pyrenees, and moved on to Portsmouth to film the scenes where the Royal Navy prepares to engage the Chinese.

The main unit began filming on 1 April 1997. They were unable to use the Leavesden Film Studios, which they had constructed from a former Rolls-Royce factory for GoldenEye, because George Lucas was using it for Star Wars: Episode I – The Phantom Menace, so instead they constructed sound stages at a nearby industrial estate. They also used the 007 Stage at Pinewood Studios.

The scene at the "U.S. Air Base in the South China Sea" where Bond hands over the GPS encoder was actually filmed in the area known as Blue Section at RAF Lakenheath, a U.S. Air Force F-15E, F-15C/D & HH-60G fighter base in the U.K.  The MH-53J in the film was from the USAF's 352nd Special Ops Group (SOG)  at RAF Mildenhall U.K. Some scenes were planned to be filmed on location in Ho Chi Minh City, Vietnam, and the production had been granted a visa. This was later rescinded, two months after planning had begun, and forced the filming to move to Bangkok, Thailand. Bond spokesman Gordon Arnell claimed the Vietnamese were unhappy with crew and equipment needed for pyrotechnics, with a Vietnamese official saying it was due to "many complicated reasons".

Two locations from previous Bond films were used: Brosnan and Hatcher's love scene was filmed at Stoke Park Club, which had been featured in Goldfinger, and the bay where they search for Carver's stealth boat is Khow-Ping-Khan island near Phuket, Thailand, previously used for The Man with the Golden Gun.

Spottiswoode tried to innovate in the action scenes. Since the director felt that after the tank chase in GoldenEye he could not use a bigger vehicle, a scene with Bond and Wai Lin in a BMW motorcycle was created. Another innovation was the remote-controlled car, which had no visible driver – an effect achieved by adapting a BMW 750i to put the steering wheel on the back seat. The car chase sequence with the 750i took three weeks to film, with Brent Cross car park being used to simulate Hamburg – although the final leap was filmed on location. A stunt involving setting fire to three vehicles produced more smoke than anticipated, causing a member of the public to call the fire brigade. The upwards camera angle filming the HALO jump created the illusion of having the stuntman opening its parachute close to the water.

During filming, there were reports of disputes on set. This was denied by Brosnan who claimed "It was nothing more than good old creative argy-bargy", with Spottiswoode saying "It has all been made up...Nothing important really went wrong." Spottiswoode did not return to direct the next film; he said the producers asked him, but he was too tired. Apparently, Brosnan and Hatcher feuded briefly during filming due to her arriving late onto the set one day. The matter was quickly resolved though and Brosnan apologised to Hatcher after realising she was pregnant and was late for that reason.

Tomorrow Never Dies marked the first appearance of the Walther P99 as Bond's pistol. It replaced the Walther PPK that the character had carried in every Eon Bond film since of Dr. No in 1962, with the exception of Moonraker in which Bond was not seen with a pistol. Walther wanted to debut its new firearm in a Bond film, which had been one of its most visible endorsers. Previously the P5 was introduced in Octopussy. Bond would use the P99 until Daniel Craig reverted to the PPK as 007 in Quantum of Solace in 2008.

The World Is Not Enough (1999)

The pre-title sequence begins in Bilbao, Spain, featuring the Guggenheim Museum. After the opening scene, the film moves to London, showcasing the SIS Building and the Millennium Dome on the Thames. Following the title sequence, Eilean Donan castle in Scotland is used by MI6 as a location headquarters. Other locations include Baku, Azerbaijan, the Azerbaijan Oil Rocks and Istanbul, Turkey, where Maiden's Tower is shown.

The studio work for the film was shot as usual in Pinewood Studios, including Albert R. Broccoli's 007 Stage. Bilbao, Spain was used briefly for the exterior of Swiss bank and flyover-bridge adjacent to the Guggenheim Museum. In London outdoor footage was shot of the SIS Building and Vauxhall Cross with several weeks filming the boat chase on the River Thames eastwards towards the Millennium Dome, Greenwich. The canal footage of the chase where Bond soaks the parking wardens was filmed at Wapping and the boat stunts in Millwall Dock and under Glengall Bridge were filmed at the Isle of Dogs. Stowe School, Buckinghamshire, was used as the site of the King family estate on banks of Loch Lomond. Filming was then shot in Scotland at the Eilean Donan Castle to depict the exterior of MI6 temporary operations centre at "Castle Thane". The skiing chase sequence in the Caucasus was shot on the slopes of Chamonix, France. Filming of the scene was delayed by an avalanche, but the crew wasted no time by helping the rescue operation.

The interior (and single exterior shot) of L'Or Noir casino in Baku, Azerbaijan, was shot at Halton House, the Officer's Mess of RAF Halton, and RAF Northolt was used to depict the airfield runway in Azerbaijan.
Zukovsky's caviar factory was shot entirely at the outdoor water tank at Pinewood.

The exterior of Kazakhstan nuclear facility was shot at the Bardenas Reales, in Navarre, Spain, and the exterior of oil refinery control centre at the Motorola building in Groundwell, Swindon. The exterior of oil pipeline was filmed in Cwm Dyli, Snowdonia, Wales, while the production teams shot the oil pipeline explosion in Hankley Common, Elstead, Surrey. Istanbul, Turkey, was indeed used in the film and Elektra King's Baku villa was actually in the city, also using the Maiden's Tower which was used as Renard's hideout in Turkey. The underwater submarine scenes were filmed in The Bahamas.

The BMW Z8 driven by Bond in the film was the final part of a three-movie product placement deal with BMW (which began with the Z3 in GoldenEye and continued with the 750iL in Tomorrow Never Dies) but, due to filming preceding release of the Z8 by a few months, several working mock-ups and models were manufactured for filming purposes. As of 2023, Bond has never again driven a BMW.

Reception table

References

James Bond in film
1990s in film